Bolazine capronate (brand name Roxilon Inject), also known as bolazine caproate or bolazine hexanoate, as well as di(drostanolone capronate) azine or 2α-methyl-5α-androstan-17β-ol-3-one 17β-hexanoate azine, is a synthetic, injected androgen/anabolic steroid (AAS) and derivative of dihydrotestosterone (DHT). It is an androgen ester – specifically, the C17β hexanoate ester of bolazine.

See also 
 List of androgen esters § Dihydrotestosterone esters

References 

Androgen esters
Androgens and anabolic steroids
Androstanes
Caproate esters
Dimers (chemistry)
Prodrugs